Joan Keller Stern, born as Joan Keller, (born February 6, 1944) is an American film producer and film actress who was awarded an Oscar in 1970 for the documentary short film she produced  The Magic Machines.

Career
Joan Keller Stern's name first appeared in the film industry in 1967 when she was on the cast list in the horror film Spider Baby by Jack Hill in a smaller role as Aunt Martha and was named in the costume area.

In 1969, Keller Stern appeared as the producer of the short documentary film The Magic Machines, for whose production she was awarded an Oscar. The film also received the Jury Prize at the 1970 Cannes Film Festival. The film presents the work of the sculptor Robert Gilbert, who creates kinetic and mechanical machines from scrap parts, which he then paints.

Later Joan Keller remarried - the son of David O. Selznick, Daniel Selznick - and called himself from then on Joan Keller Selznick. Keller Selznick has since made a name for herself as a socialite and host of dinner parties for high-ranking personalities.

Selected filmography
1967: Spider Baby (actress & costume area)
1969: The Magic Machines (documentary short film; producer)

Awards and nominations
Won - Academy Award for Best Live Action Short Film for The Magic Machines (1969)
Nominated - Academy Award for Best Documentary (Short Subject) for The Magic Machines (1969)

References

External links 
 

American film producers
American cinematographers
1944 births
Producers who won the Live Action Short Film Academy Award
20th-century American businesspeople
Living people